Inscudderia is a genus of North American "cypress katydids" in the family Tettigoniidae. There are currently three described species in Inscudderia.

Species
These three species belong to the genus Inscudderia:
 Inscudderia strigata (Scudder, 1898) (guinea-cypress katydid)
 Inscudderia taxodii Caudell, 1921 (western cypress katydid)
 Inscudderia walkeri Hebard, 1925 (eastern cypress katydid)

References

Further reading

 

Phaneropterinae
Articles created by Qbugbot